The Lost Tape is a 2012 Indian Hindi-language found footage psychological horror film directed by Rakshit Dahiya and produced by Ashok Baphna. The film's cinematography is done by Dhaval Ganbote, a graduate from Whistling Woods International Institute and is edited by Vivek Agrawal, an editing Faculty of Whistling Woods International Institute. All Media Rights of the film are owned by Dimension Pictures.

Plot
5 youngsters went into the woods of Chail, Himachal Pradesh to explore an old urban legend's story. They were completely unaware of the fact that they were slowly becoming part of the story. The more they found out, the closer they got to the unexplained reality, of what they thought was merely a myth. After entering into the woods, they were never seen again. The search went on for 6 months and the case was closed. Until one day, police recovered a digital video recorder, which held the unexplained secret. This film unfolds the mystery of those 5 youngsters’ mysterious disappearance. A tale of Love, friendship, betrayal and fear. Fear of the devil and fear of the Lord himself.

Cast
Ankuar Panchal As Lavish 
Esha Rajee as Jassi
Actor Nishant Tanwar as Rahul 
Monali Sehgal as Ayesha
Shaurya Singh as Jai

Filming
The shoot took place in the forests of Chail, Himachal Pradesh.

References

External links
 
 

Indian psychological horror films
2012 films
2012 horror films
2010s Hindi-language films
Hindi-language horror films

Found footage films
Films shot in Himachal Pradesh
Films set in Himachal Pradesh